Golbahar may refer to:

Afghanistan
 Gulbahar, Afghanistan

Iran
 Shahr Jadid-e Golbahar, a city near Mashhad city (40 km far from Mashhad)
 Golbahar, Khuzestan
 Golbahar-e Atabaki, a village in Lorestan Province, Iran
 Golbahar-e Olya, a village in Lorestan Province, Iran
 Golbahar-e Sheykh Miri, a village in Lorestan Province, Iran
 Golbahar-e Sofla, a village in Lorestan Province, Iran
 Golbahar-e Yusefabad, a village in Lorestan Province, Iran

Pakistan
Gulbahar, a neighborhood of Karachi, Sindh, Pakistan